Lechedzani Luza (born December 20, 1978) is a boxer from Botswana. At the 2002 Commonwealth Games, Luza took the silver medal. He took gold in 2004 at the 2nd Olympic Qualifying Tournament in Gaborone, Botswana, finally defeating Madagascar's Georges Rakotoarimbelo. He went on to the 2004 Summer Olympics in Athens, Greece, but Morocco's Hicham Mesbahi eliminated him in the first round of the men's flyweight (– 51 kg) division.

References
sports-reference

External links
 

1978 births
Living people
Flyweight boxers
Botswana male boxers
Boxers at the 2002 Commonwealth Games
Boxers at the 2004 Summer Olympics
Boxers at the 2006 Commonwealth Games
Olympic boxers of Botswana
Commonwealth Games silver medallists for Botswana
Commonwealth Games medallists in boxing
Medallists at the 2002 Commonwealth Games